Hur Hyun-jun (born March 9, 2000), known professionally as Hyun Jun, and formerly known by the stage name Hwall, is a South Korean singer and actor. He is best known as a former member of South Korean boy group The Boyz. He has also gained recognition with the web series Color Rush (2021).

Early life 
Hyun Jun was born on March 9, 2000. He graduated from Hanlim Multi Art School in 2019.

Career

2017–2019: Debut with The Boyz 
In early July, music label Cre.ker Entertainment started releasing videos of artists joining their newest boy group. On July 18, Hur was confirmed to be in the final lineup of the group, The Boyz. From August 23 to October 11, Hur joined his second reality show Flower Boy Snack Shop, this time joining his bandmates and releasing the song "I'm Your Boy" during the finale episode. On December 6, the group officially debuted, selling out all 4,000 seats debut showcase where they released their first extended play The First and its lead single "Boy".

The group released their second extended play The Start and its lead single "Giddy Up" on April 3, 2018. Due to health problems, Hur couldn't promote with the group and subsequently had to halt all activities for three months. The twelve members, with Hur back from his hiatus, released a special digital single titled "Keeper" on July 12, which was produced by Block B's Park Kyung. On July 24, they won their first "Rookie Award" during the Korea Brand Awards. He also won several awards with The Boyz, including the "Rookie Award" at the Soribada Best K-Music Awards and the "Best New Male Artist Award" at the 2018 Melon Music Awards.

In 2019, Hur went on tour with The Boyz' Asia fan concert tour "The Castle", with dates in South Korea, Japan, Hong Kong, Singapore, Indonesia, Thailand, Taiwan, and the Philippines. The group released their second single album Bloom Bloom and its lead single "Bloom Bloom" on April 29, 2019. On 7 May, Hur received his first-ever music show win on SBS MTV's The Show with The Boyz. The group released their fourth extended play Dreamlike and its lead single "D.D.D" on August 19, Hur did not participate in the ‘DDD’ promotions due to his ankle. He only appeared in certain parts of the MV. On October 23, Hur officially left the group due to health issues and pursued a solo and acting career afterwards.

2020–present: Solo work 
On August 14, 2020, He made his solo debut with the song "Baragi" under his own music label, Dia Note.

In April 2021, Hur released his second digital single "Vo!d". He released an acoustic version of "Baragi" on June 19. Later that year, Hur made his acting debut with the web series Color Rush.

On January 3, 2022, Hur released his third digital single "Let Me Drown". On February 18, it was confirmed that Hur had signed an exclusive contract with Blossom Entertainment to pursue his solo career.

On April 1, 2022, Blossom Entertainment confirmed through his Instagram account that Hyun Jun has been cast in the play 'Yeodo'. The performance was at Baekam Art Hall in Gangnam-gu, Seoul, from May 28 to July 10, 2022.

Discography

As lead singles

Filmography

Web series

Theater

Songwriting credits

References 

2000 births
Living people
K-pop singers
The Boyz (South Korean band)
Korean-language singers
South Korean male singers
South Korean pop singers
South Korean singer-songwriters
21st-century South Korean singers
South Korean male idols
South Korean male singer-songwriters
Hanlim Multi Art School alumni